Aquila Municipality is a municipality in Veracruz, Mexico. It is located about 136 km from state capital Xalapa to the south-west. It has a surface of 35.37 km2.

Borders
Aquila Municipality is delimited to the north by Puebla State, to the east by Maltrata Municipality, to the south by Acultzingo Municipality and to the west by Puebla State.

Products
It produces maize.

References

External links 
  Municipal Official Site
  Municipal Official Information

Municipalities of Veracruz